The 2011 European Karate Championships, the 46th edition, were held in Zürich, Switzerland from 6 to 8 May 2011. A total of 470 competitors form 44 countries participated at the event.

Medalists

Men's competition

Individual

Team

Women's competition

Individual

Team

Medal table

References

2011
International sports competitions hosted by Switzerland
European Karate Championships
European championships in 2011
Sport in Zürich
Karate competitions in Switzerland
21st century in Zürich
May 2011 sports events in Europe